Eunice Chebichii Chumba (born 23 May 1993) is a Kenyan born Bahraini female long distance runner as well as a cross country runner who has represented Bahrain after her switch from Kenya in several international sport events including Asian Games, Asian Athletics Championships, Asian Cross Country Championships. She is currently ranked as 13th all time best runner in half marathon history with a record timing of 1:06:11 which she achieved on 17 September 2017 during the Copenhagen Half Marathon.

Eunice Chumba was born and raised in Kenya before moving to Bahrain in 2014. She settled in Bahrain and was motivated by her father to represent Bahrain in athletics at international arena.

She claimed her first athletics senior gold medal in Manama at the 2016 Asian Cross Country Championships. Eunice achieved gold medal at the 2017 Copenhagen Half Marathon with establishing a new Copenhagen Half Marathon record among women by finishing with a record time of 1:06:11. She also set a new Beirut Marathon record among women in 2017 with a record finish of 2:28:43 and eventually secured a gold medal in the event.

Eunice Chumba claimed her first Asian Games medal, silver in the women's 10,000 m event representing Bahrain at the 2018 Asian Games.

References

External links 
 

1993 births
Living people
Kenyan emigrants to Bahrain
Naturalized citizens of Bahrain
Bahraini female long-distance runners
Bahraini female marathon runners
Bahraini female cross country runners
Asian Games silver medalists for Bahrain
Asian Games medalists in athletics (track and field)
Athletes (track and field) at the 2014 Asian Games
Athletes (track and field) at the 2018 Asian Games
Medalists at the 2018 Asian Games
Asian Cross Country Championships winners
Athletes (track and field) at the 2020 Summer Olympics
Olympic athletes of Bahrain